Zahora is a genus of flowering plants belonging to the family Brassicaceae.

Its native range is Morocco.

Species:
 Zahora ait-atta Lemmel & M.Koch

References

Brassicaceae
Brassicaceae genera